Pérignac may refer to the following places in France:

Pérignac, Charente, a commune in the department of Charente
Pérignac, Charente-Maritime, a commune in the department of Charente-Maritime